Canoeing at the 2000 Summer Olympics was held at the Sydney International Regatta Centre for the sprint events and the Whitewater Stadium in Penrith for the canoe and kayak slalom disciplines. The repechage rounds that ran from the 1960 to the 1996 Games were eliminated in the sprint events while qualifying rounds were added to the slalom events. Additionally, a quota system for each event was enacted, meaning each event had a limited number of competitors that could compete.

A total of 16 events were contested, 12 sprint events (9 for men and 3 for women) and 4 slalom events (3 for men and 1 for women).

Medal summary

By event

Slalom
Men

Women

Sprint
Men

Women

By nation

References
2000 Summer Olympics Canoe slalom results. 
2000 Summer Olympics Canoe sprint results. 

 
2000 Summer Olympics events
2000
Olympics
Canoeing and kayaking competitions in Australia